Campsis radicans, the trumpet vine, yellow trumpet vine, or trumpet creeper (also known in North America as cow itch vine or hummingbird vine), is a species of flowering plant in the family Bignoniaceae, native to the eastern United States, and naturalized elsewhere. It inhabits woodlands and riverbanks, and is also a popular garden subject.

Description
The plant can form a dense groundcover or an aggressive liana covering plants or buildings. The leaves are opposite and odd-pinnately compound, meaning there is an odd number of leaflets, with one terminal leaflet. The leaflets are emerald green when new, maturing into a shiny dark green. They are ovate to broadly lanceolate and the edges are coarsely serrate. 

The flowers come in terminal cymes of 2-8. They are orange to reddish orange in color with a yellowish throat and 5 shallow lobes bending backward. and generally appear after several months of warm weather. The flowers have no floral scent.

Taxonomy 
The flamboyant flowering of Campsis radicans made it obvious to even the least botanically-minded of the first English colonists in Virginia. Consequently, the plant quickly made its way to England early in the 17th century. Its botanical parentage, as a hardy member of a mostly subtropical group, made its naming problematic: according to John Parkinson, the Virginia settlers were at first calling it a jasmine or a honeysuckle, and then a bellflower; he classed it in the genus Apocynum (dogbane). Joseph Pitton de Tournefort erected a catch-all genus Bignonia in 1700, from which it has since been extricated.

The Latin specific epithet radicans means "with stems that take root". The plant is commonly known as cow-itch vine because skin redness and itching is experienced by some people after coming in contact with the leaves.

Distribution 
Campsis radicans is native to the eastern United States and extreme southern Ontario. It is naturalized in parts of the western United States as well as in Ontario and southern Quebec, parts of Europe, and scattered locations in Latin America.

Ecology
The flowers bloom in the summer for about 2 months and are very attractive to hummingbirds, and many types of birds like to nest in the dense foliage. Moths, bees, flies, and ants also feed on the nectar of the flowers. The flowers are followed by large seed pods.  As these mature, they dry and split.  Hundreds of thin, brown, paper-like seeds are released. These are easily grown when stratified. Larvae of the Clydonopteron sacculana (trumpet vine moth) feed on the seed pods.

Cultivation
The trumpet vine grows vigorously. In warm weather, it puts out aerial rootlets that grab onto every available surface, and eventually expand into heavy woody stems several centimeters in diameter. It grows well on arbors, fences, telephone poles, and trees, although it may dismember them in the process. Ruthless pruning is recommended. Outside of its native range this species has the potential to be  invasive, even as far north as New England. The trumpet vine thrives in many places in southern Canada as well.

Away from summer heat, C. radicans is less profuse of flower. A larger-flowered hybrid 'Mme Galen' was introduced about 1889 by the Tagliabue nurserymen of Lainate near Milan.

The form C. radicans f. flava has gained the Royal Horticultural Society's Award of Garden Merit.

Toxicity 
The plant can cause contact dermatitis.

References

External links

Campsis radicans images at bioimages.vanderbilt.edu

radicans
Vines
Flora of North America
Garden plants of North America
Plants described in 1753
Taxa named by Carl Linnaeus